The NWT Liquor Licensing Board regulates:
Liquor sales and service in restaurants, bars, and  special events; 
Liquor manufacturers, and 
Liquor service and sales at special occasion events. 

The Liquor Licensing Board is a regulatory and quasi-judicial administrative tribunal that is independent from government. The Board administers several parts of the NWT Liquor Act and the NWT Liquor Regulations.

External links
 http://www.fin.gov.nt.ca/services/liquor/liquor-licensing-board

Canadian provincial alcohol departments and agencies
Government of the Northwest Territories